Daniella Yousef Rahme is a Lebanese Australian actress and TV presenter. She was the winner of Miss Lebanon Emigrant 2010, and winner of Dancing with the Stars: Raqs el Noujoum season 2.

Early life
Daniella Rahme was born in Sydney to Lebanese singer Youssef Rahme who immigrated to Australia during the Lebanese Civil War. She studied at the National Institute of Dramatic Art and Macquarie University in Sydney.

Career
Daniella's first TV Foot Locker commercial was in 2009. Later on, she was selected to participate in the second edition of Dancing with the Stars: Raqs el Noujoum in 2014. Her boundless energy, captivating presence, and lauded performances quickly made her a fan favorite, and she was crowned the winner. She then went on to host The MBC X Factor, followed by the popular talent show, Arab Casting, on Abu Dhabi TV.

She has always had a passion for acting, fostering it during her school years by participating in theater and drama programs. That dream became a concrete reality in 2018. She debuted her acting career as Yara in Beirut City, receiving hugely positive reviews from critics and audiences alike. Then she acted as Farah in Tango sharing the screen with Bassel Khayat, Bassem Moughnieh, and Dana Mardini. The series was met with acclaim and high ratings, and Daniella's performance was greatly praised, earning the Murex d'Or for "Phenomenon of the Year 2018", and "Best Actress 2018" from Al-Anbaa in Kuwait.

Daniella took on her third lead role as Majdouline in The Writer that was streamed on Netflix worldwide, with the show reaching Trending status on the platform, solidifying her image as one of the most talented actresses across the Arab world. In addition, she participated in Al Awdah, and Awlad Adam which was streamed during Ramadan 2020. In December 2020, Daniella's series called DNA was streamed on shahid Vip and she played the role of Aya.
In Ramadan 2021 and 2022, Daniella played the role of Rym in Lal Mot.Daniella won as the best actress in Murex dor 2020 for her role in Awlad Adam, and the best Lebanese actress 2022 in Diafa awards.

Criticism 
Despite Daniella's success, she faced much criticism regarding her Australian accent and that people can see its impact on her acting roles. When Daniella was asked about her opinion to what is being said multiple times, she said that her role in Awlad Adam proved to all criticizers wrong and that she "doesn't care". Also, she mentioned that she is focusing on herself, being busy, and she preferred not to answer what is being said on the media.

Other activities
She is the ambassador for L'Oreal Paris, first female Ambassador of Hublot watches in the MENA region and Galaxy Chocolates. Daniella is involved with a slew of causes and charities both in Lebanon and abroad, in raising funds and awareness for Himaya, the Children’s Cancer Center, the Hôtel Dieu hospital, and the Starlight Foundation in Australia; she is also a Heartbeat ambassador. In Namibia, she worked with the Knowledge Foundation and wishes to establish her own charitable foundation.

Awards and Contests 
 Winner of Miss Lebanon Australia 2009
 Winner of Miss Lebanon Emigrant 2010
 Contestant of Miss International 2010
 Contestant of Miss Supranational 2011 (Semi-Finalist)
 Winner of Dancing with the Stars: Raqs el Noujoum in 2014
Murex D'or Award (for phenomenon of the year) in 2018
Best actress 2018 from al Anbaa Kuwait
Murex D'or award for best Lebanese actress in 2020 for her role in Awlad Adam
 Diafa award for best Lebanese actress 2022

Filmography

References

External links
 Official Site
 Dwts Season 2 TV streams of  Daniella Rahme
 
 

Living people
Actresses from Sydney
Miss Lebanon Emigrant
2010 beauty pageants
2010 in Lebanon
Lebanese beauty pageant winners
Lebanese female models
Miss International 2010 delegates
Lebanese Christians
Australian people of Lebanese descent
National Institute of Dramatic Art alumni
Macquarie University alumni
Year of birth missing (living people)